Kylee Cochran is an American actress.

Cochran had roles in several films such as The Crow: Salvation, Gangland and The Paper Brigade. She also had single episode guest appearances in television series such as ER, House M.D., and has appeared alongside her ex-husband Seth Peterson on Burn Notice.  Seth and Kylee filed for divorce in late 2013. Her son, Lennon, stars as Holden Lowe in American Horror Story: Hotel. She is first cousins with musician Tucker Rountree.

References

External links
 
 

American film actresses
American television actresses
Living people
Place of birth missing (living people)
Year of birth missing (living people)
21st-century American women